The Abbey of Saint Mary of Crossraguel is a ruin of a former abbey near the town of Maybole, South Ayrshire, Scotland. Although it is a ruin, visitors can still see the original monks’ church, their cloister and their dovecot (pigeon tower).

Foundation
Founded in 1244 by Donnchadh, Earl of Carrick, following an earlier donation of 1225, to the monks of Paisley Abbey for that purpose.  They reputedly  built nothing more than a small chapel and kept the balance for themselves.  The Earl took the matter to the Bishop of Glasgow for arbitration and, winning his case, forced the monks to build a proper abbey.

Name
The origin of the abbey's name refers to the ancient Cross of Riaghail (Latin form St Regulus) that stood on the spot.  Crossraguel was a Cluniac abbey and the monks - members of a branch of the Benedictines - were known as the "Black monks" after the colour of their clothes.

History 
Crossraguel Abbey was founded in 1244 by Duncan, 1st Earl of Carrick. The earl sought assistance from the abbot and monks of Paisley Abbey and provided them with land and funds. However, the Paisley superiors built only a small chapel for Crossraguel and kept the remainder for themselves. Upset at this, the earl took the case to law, seeking assistance from the Bishop of Glasgow, who ruled on the earl's behalf. He required not only that Paisley build the monastery at Crossraguel, but also that some of the monks from Paisley should be transferred there.  These monks were given the authority to choose their own abbot. The abbot of Paisley, it was decreed, was not to interfere with Crossraguel's affairs, though he was allowed a yearly visit. All of Paisley's possessions in Carrick were to be handed over to Crossraguel, a ruling which the abbot of Paisley appealed to the pope in 1265, but to no avail.

Crossraguel was sacked in 1307 by the army of Edward I.  It was rebuilt on a larger scale and remained a monastery until 1560, when the Reformation ended monastic institutions in Scotland.  However, the few remaining monks were allowed to live out their time there until the last monk died in 1601. Some of the stone has been removed for local construction, but the abbey ruins remain some of the most complete of any medieval religious house to survive in Scotland.  Like Paisley Abbey, Crossraguel was of the Order of Cluny whose mission was to encourage pilgrimage. It is no accident then that Crossraguel is halfway between Paisley and Whithorn on the Ayrshire pilgrims' trail to the shrine of St Ninian in The Machars of Galloway. The site is looked after by Historic Environment Scotland as a scheduled monument and is open to the public with an entrance charge.

In autumn, 1506, Montjoie (Gilbert Chauveau), French King of Arms, visited Crossraguel probably as part of his diplomatic missions regarding Scottish military support for King Hans (John) of Denmark. Montjoie had already spent time at the Court of King Henry VII of England before moving to Scotland and from there, visited Denmark. The record of him visiting Crossraguel is found in the Treasurer's Accounts of James IV, King of Scots – ‘Item, to Johne Beg, messingeir, to pas to Corsragwell and other places with writingis to warne of Montjoyis cummyng, ..... iiij s.’

c. 1510, directed by David Kennedy the first Earl of Cassilis, with encouragement from James IV, monks at Crossraguel developed production of salt by the boiling sea water in pans, and the grinding of charcoal for gunpowder.</ref> Nigel Tranter, A Flame For The Fire, ISIS Large Print edition pp. 348, 361–2.</ref>

In 1570, the Kennedy family, Earls of Cassilis famously obtained the lands of Crossraguel Abbey through the torturing by Gilbert Kennedy, 4th Earl of Cassilis of Allan Stewart, the commendator at his castle of Dunure. A feud followed including a number of families and lasted until at least 1611. The Reformation (c. 1560) led to the destruction of many abbeys but Crossraguel was not badly damaged; nonetheless, monastic life here ceased before the end of the 16th century.

James VI intended to rebuild the abbey or abbot's house in 1603 for the use of his son, Prince Henry. In December 1612 James VI granted the former abbey to Peter Hewat, minister at St Giles Cathedral in Edinburgh who owned it until his death in 1645.

Present day
The Visit Scotland web site describes the property as follows. "Although a ruin, the Crossraguel Abbey is still complete with the original monks’ church, their cloister and even their dovecot (pigeon tower). Fine architectural details from the 15th century can still be seen within the ruins with the chapter house still standing complete with benches for the monks and an arched seat for the abbot." Another site adds that "visitors can wander around the 15th century choir building, with its ornate carvings, the tower house and gatehouse ... There are stairs to the top of the gatehouse".

See also
 Abbot of Crossraguel, for list of abbots and commendators
 Abbeys and priories in Scotland

References

Sources

 Ayrshire and Galloway Archaeological Association,Charters of Crossraguel Abbey, II Vols. Edinburgh 1886

External links
Historic Environment Scotland: Visitor guide
Crossraguel Abbey – at Mysterious Britain
Crossraguel Abbey – Photos at the Maybole town home page
Crossraguel Abbey – at Baltersan Castle website
 Engraving of Crossraguel Abbey in 1693 by John Slezer at National Library of Scotland

13th-century church buildings in Scotland
1240s establishments in Scotland
Religious organizations established in the 1240s
Listed monasteries in Scotland
Cluniac monasteries in Scotland
Christian monasteries established in the 13th century
Museums in South Ayrshire
Religious museums in Scotland
17th-century disestablishments in Scotland
1610s disestablishments in Scotland
Ruined abbeys and monasteries
Ruins in South Ayrshire
Historic Scotland properties in South Ayrshire
Scheduled Ancient Monuments in South Ayrshire
Former Christian monasteries in Scotland